György Babolcsay (26 December 1921 – 13 July 1976) was a Hungarian football player and manager.

Career

Playing career
Babolcsay played club football for hometown side Budapest Honvéd FC also known as Kispesti AC. He also represented the Hungarian national side, and earned a total of 4caps for the team between 1950 and 1953.

Coaching career
Babolcsay managed Budapest Honvéd FC, Békéscsaba 1912 Előre SE and Greek side PAOK.

References

1921 births
1976 deaths
Hungarian footballers
Association football forwards
Hungary international footballers
Budapest Honvéd FC players
Hungarian football managers
Budapest Honvéd FC managers
PAOK FC managers
Expatriate football managers in Greece
Békéscsaba 1912 Előre managers